Jake Dolegala (born October 7, 1996) is an American football quarterback for the Saskatchewan Roughriders of the Canadian Football League (CFL). He played college football at Central Connecticut, and signed with the Cincinnati Bengals as an undrafted free agent in 2019. He has also been a member of the Green Bay Packers, and New England Patriots.

College career
Coming out of high school, Dolegala only had one college offer. This led him to attend Milford Academy for their 2014 season, where he threw for 2,276 yards and 20 touchdowns.

Dolegala was recruited to play at Central after his year at the Milford Academy. In his first year for the Blue Devils he appeared in 10 games and had seven passing touchdowns and three rushing. Dolegala was a four-year starter for the Central Connecticut Blue Devils, where he threw for 8,129 yards and 48 touchdowns.

Professional career

Cincinnati Bengals
After going undrafted in the 2019 NFL Draft, Dolegala signed with the Cincinnati Bengals. He spent the entire 2019 NFL season on the Bengals' 53-man roster, but did not appear in a game for the Bengals. After the Bengals drafted Joe Burrow first overall, Dolegala competed for the team's backup quarterback position with Ryan Finley. Dolegala was waived during the team's final cutdowns on September 5, 2020.

New England Patriots
On September 16, 2020, Dolegala was signed to the practice squad of the New England Patriots. He was released by the Patriots on November 12. Dolegala was re-signed to the practice squad on November 16. He signed a reserve/future contract on January 4, 2021. On April 30, 2021, Dolegala was waived by the Patriots after they drafted Mac Jones.

Green Bay Packers
On June 10, 2021, Dolegala signed a contract with the Green Bay Packers. He was released on July 27, 2021.

New England Patriots (II)
On July 28, 2021, Dolegala was claimed off waivers by the New England Patriots. He was waived on August 9, 2021.

Green Bay Packers (II)
On August 17, 2021, Dolegala signed with the Green Bay Packers. He was waived on August 27, 2021.

Miami Dolphins
On October 27, 2021, Dolegala was signed to the Miami Dolphins practice squad. He was released on November 17.

On December 17, 2021, it was reported that Dolegala would sign with the Cleveland Browns. The deal ended up not coming to fruition after the Browns signed Kyle Lauletta off of the Jacksonville Jaguars' practice squad.

Saskatchewan Roughriders
On February 15, 2022, Dolegala signed with the Saskatchewan Roughriders of the Canadian Football League. With starting quarterback Cody Fajardo nursing an injured knee and possible Covid infection, Dolegala finally took his first professional regular-season snap and made his first CFL start on July 24, 2022, when he was named the starting quarterback against the Toronto Argonauts. In his debut performance Dolegala completed 13 of 28 pass attempts for 131 yards with one touchdown and one interception as the Riders were defeated 31–21. Dolegala was suspended by the team in late September 2022 after he was arrested for impaired driving.

Personal life
Dolegala's grandfather Al Bemiller was a member of the 1959 Syracuse Orangemen football team that won a national title; Al later played for the Buffalo Bills from 1961 to 1969.

References

1996 births
Living people
American football quarterbacks
Central Connecticut Blue Devils football players
Cincinnati Bengals players
Green Bay Packers players
Miami Dolphins players
New England Patriots players
Players of American football from New York (state)
People from Hamburg, New York
Sportspeople from Erie County, New York
Saskatchewan Roughriders players